CentralPlaza Chonburi is a shopping and entertainment complex located on Sukhumvit Rd., Chonburi, Thailand. The shopping mall opened its doors on May 29, 2009.

The mall is one of the largest lifestyle shopping complexes in the Eastern Region of Thailand, providing complete offerings, including Robinson Department Store, Big C hypermarket, retail shops, restaurants and an entertainment complex. The total cost of the shopping complex was 4,6 billion baht.

Anchors 
 Robinson Department Store
 Big C (Old Carrefour)
 Tops
 SF Cinema 7 Cinemas
 B2S
 Officemate
 Power Buy
 Supersports
 Food Park
 Social House
 Fitness First
 Lotus's Chonburi (Next to Big C Central Chonburi)

See also 
 List of shopping malls in Thailand

Notes

References

External links 
 Robinson website
 CentralPlaza

Shopping malls in Thailand
Central Pattana
Shopping malls established in 2009
2009 establishments in Thailand